Norbert Gombos was the defending champion but chose not to defend his title.

Emilio Gómez won the title after defeating Alexis Galarneau 6–3, 7–6(7–4) in the final.

Seeds

Draw

Finals

Top half

Bottom half

References

External links
Main draw
Qualifying draw

Winnipeg National Bank Challenger - 1
2022 Singles